John Anthony Curdo (November 14, 1931 – September 30, 2022) was an American chess player from Auburn, Massachusetts, best known for winning the Massachusetts state championship 17 times between 1948 and 1985, as well as the US Senior Championship.  Though Curdo never attained the rank of Grandmaster or International Master, he was known for over 50 years as one of the strongest players in New England, with victories over Grandmasters Pal Benko, Robert Byrne, and Arthur Bisguier, among many others. At his peak, his United States Chess Federation rating exceeded 2500.

As of August 2009, Curdo had won 830 tournaments over the course of his career, a number believed to be a world record by a wide margin. By December 2011, he had attained 865 tournament wins, while in 2018 he had extended the number to 1000 tournament victories. His opening repertoire remained relatively consistent throughout his career, and he was well known as an expert on the Dutch Defense and the Belgrade Gambit of the Four Knights Game.  Curdo published four game collections, including the annotated game collection Forty Years at the Top and the Chess Caviar series (Chess Caviar, More Chess Caviar and Still More Chess Caviar).

Selected Game

https://www.chessgames.com/perl/chessgame?gid=1361815 Curdo vs. GM Robert Byrne, US Open, August 10, 1994. In a wild Sicilian, Curdo uncorks a blistering mating combination.

1.e4 c5 2.Nf3 d6 3.Bb5+ Nd7 4.d4 Nf6 5.e5 Qa5+ 6.Nc3 Ne4 7.Bd2 Nxc3 8.Bxd7+ Bxd7 9.Bxc3 Qa6 10.d5 e6 11.Ng5 dxe5 12.Qf3 f6 13.dxe6 Bc6 14.Qf5 Be7 15.O-O-O g6 16.Qh3 fxg5 17.Bxe5 O-O 18.Qh6 Rf6 19.h4 Qxa2 20.Qxh7+ Kxh7 21.hxg5+ Kg8 22.gxf6 1-0

References

External links
 Selected games of John Curdo at Chessgames.com
 Excerpt from Forty Years At the Top, at Chesscafe.com

1931 births
American chess players
Chess FIDE Masters